Herma Katharina Anna Kirchschläger, GCIH (née Sorger) (15 May 1916 in Vienna – 30 May 2009 in Vienna) was the wife of Rudolf Kirchschläger, the former minister of foreign affairs and later federal president of Austria. They married on 17 August 1940 and they had two children: Christa (born 14 August 1944) and Walter (born 27 April 1947).

Honour
 Grand-Cross of the Order of Prince Henry, Portugal (1984)

References 

1916 births
2009 deaths
Spouses of presidents of Austria
People from Vienna